Kingdom of Conspiracy is the ninth studio album by American death metal band Immolation. It was released on May 10, 2013 through Nuclear Blast Records. The album is Immolation's first concept album and was produced by Paul Orofino, who has produced every Immolation album since 1999's Failures for Gods.

Concept
Kingdom of Conspiracy continues to explore political subject matter rather than the anti-religion topics that dominated the band's earlier releases. Ross Dolan said this is the band's first concept album and that it was influenced by George Orwell's Nineteen Eighty-Four.  He described the theme in an interview with Metal Blast:

The album artwork, by Pär Olofsson, also elaborated upon the concept.  As guitarist Robert Vigna explained, the figures are shackles with their eyes and mouths sewn shut to represent "the chilling of speech and the intentional blinding of the masses."  Furthermore, the large structure in the background, which Vigna described as "ominous", symbolized the growth of the security state and the consequent failing of existing social structures.

Reception

Kingdom of Conspiracy received positive reviews from music critics. Writing for About.com, Dave Schalek called the album "essential," praising its "big, baroque songs with atypical, swirling riffs." Denise Falzon of Exclaim wrote that the band "push[es] their boundaries with fresh, innovative twists, in order to create albums that build upon their style while remaining distinctly Immolation." At Pitchfork, Hank Shteamer called the band "one of the most rewarding veteran acts in the genre" and said that "like their contemporaries Suffocation and Incantation, Immolation are currently producing some of the strongest material of their career, an expertly calibrated blend of the byzantine and the straightforwardly brutal, simply by following their own muse."

The album debuted at number 13 on Billboard's Heatseekers Albums chart. Immolation's previous album, Majesty and Decay, had debuted at number 29 on the same chart.

Track listing

Personnel
Immolation
 Ross Dolan – vocals, bass
 Steve Shalaty – drums
 Bill Taylor – guitars
 Robert Vigna – guitars

Production
Zack Ohren – mixing, mastering
Pär Olofsson – cover art
Paul Orofino – producer

References

2013 albums
Immolation (band) albums
Nuclear Blast albums
Albums with cover art by Pär Olofsson